The  was an infantry division of the Imperial Japanese Army. It was formed 16 May 1944 in Arxan as a triangular division. The nucleus for the formation was the 7th independent mixed regiment. The division was permanently assigned to the 44th army.

Action
During a Soviet invasion of Manchuria the 107th division was ordered to march 600 km from Arxan to Changchun 12 August 1945. 14 August 1945, the advance elements of the 107th division were ambushed by the Soviet armoured regiment. 15 August 1945 the 107th division was cut from all communications, including radio, and fled to the Inder in Jalaid Banner mountainous region, breaking a contact with Soviet forces. The contact was re-established 25 August 1945, and the division formally surrendered 27 August 1945.

During the fighting, about 1500 division members perished. A further 2000 never returned after being taken prisoner by the Soviet Union. Although a small fraction of the prisoners returned to Japan in 1949, the majority were not released until 1956.

See also
 List of Japanese Infantry Divisions

Notes and references
This article incorporates material from Japanese Wikipedia page 第107師団 (日本軍), accessed 27 June 2016
 Madej, W. Victor, Japanese Armed Forces Order of Battle, 1937–1945 [2 vols], Allentown, PA: 1981.

Japanese World War II divisions
Infantry divisions of Japan
Military units and formations established in 1944
Military units and formations disestablished in 1945
1944 establishments in Japan
1945 disestablishments in Japan